Gleb Igorevich Shilov (born 6 June 2000) is a Russian football player.

Club career
He made his debut in the Russian Football National League for FC Nizhny Novgorod on 12 October 2019 in a game against FC Rotor Volgograd.

References

External links
 
 
 Profile by Russian Football National League

2000 births
Living people
Russian footballers
Association football defenders
FC Nizhny Novgorod (2015) players
FC Khimik Dzerzhinsk players
FC Zenit-Izhevsk players